"The Walk" is a song by English rock band The Cure, released as a stand-alone single in June 1983. It later appeared on the compilation album Japanese Whispers.  It was recorded when the band was briefly reduced to the two founding members Robert Smith and Lol Tolhurst following the departure of bassist Simon Gallup following the end of the band's previous tour in support of the album Pornography. in May 1982. According to Lol Tolhurst, they chose producer Steve Nye at the time due to his work on the album Tin Drum by Japan. Tolhurst later commented: "It was the first time we had worked with a 'proper' producer, as opposed to doing production with an engineer that we really liked. […] He was able to make electronic instruments sound more natural, and that's what we wanted."

Content
One of the three B-sides to the single is "Lament", which is a re-recording of a promo single released in late 1982 for the Flexipop magazine. Unlike the earlier version, which was garbled and experimental, the lyrics are understandable and the music has a different composition.

Release
Released as a single in June 1983, "The Walk" was something of a commercial breakthrough for the group with regard to their singles output, peaking at number 12 and giving them their first entry into the UK top 20. It was also the first of their 17 consecutive Irish top 20 hits between 1983 and 1992.

The Cure recorded a completely new version of "The Walk" for their remix album Mixed Up, as the original master tapes could not be located. They later recorded an acoustic version for their ''Greatest Hits compilation.

Track listing
7"
 "The Walk"
 "The Dream"

12"
 "The Upstairs Room”
 "The Dream"
 "The Walk"
 "Lament"

US mini-LP

 "The Upstairs Room"
 "Just One Kiss"
 "The Dream"
 "The Walk"
 "Lament"
 "Let's Go to Bed (Extended Version)" (only available on some later European releases)

Personnel 
 Robert Smith – vocals, guitar, OB-8
 Lol Tolhurst – Oberheim DMX, DSX, OB-8

References

External links
 

The Cure songs
1983 singles
Songs written by Robert Smith (musician)
1983 songs
Fiction Records singles
Songs written by Lol Tolhurst